NGC 781 is a spiral galaxy in the constellation Aries. It is estimated to be about 154 million light years from the Milky Way and has a diameter of approximately 70,000 light years. NGC 781 was discovered on October 16, 1784 by the German-British astronomer William Herschel.

See also 
 List of NGC objects (1–1000)

References

External links 
 

Aries (constellation)
0781
Spiral galaxies
007577